Benjamin Pasternak (born September 6, 1999) is an Australian technology entrepreneur. He is the co-founder and CEO of SIMULATE, an American nutrition technology company. SIMULATE's signature product, NUGGS, launched in July of 2019. It is a plant-based alternative to chicken nuggets. Previously, Pasternak founded Monkey, a social networking app that enabled teenagers to video chat with like-minded people.

Pasternak was named as one of the world's most influential teenagers by Time in 2016. In 2021, Pasternak was included in the Forbes 30 Under 30 List.

Early life and education
Pasternak was born in Sydney, Australia, to Anna Pasternak and Mark Pasternak. He has a younger brother, Jake, and a younger sister, Maya. Pasternak was raised Jewish in Vaucluse, eastern Sydney. He was educated at Moriah College and Reddam House.

Pasternak started developing software at the age of 13. He designed his first publicly launched mobile app, Impossible Rush, while bored in science class at school. He showed the idea to his online friend Austin Valleskey, an iOS engineer from Chicago, and the pair created the game in a matter of hours. The game went on to be downloaded millions of times and peaked at No. 16 on the US App Store (iOS) top charts.

In January 2015, Facebook and Google offered Pasternak internship opportunities. A few months after declining the offers, Pasternak dropped out of high school at the age of 15 and moved to New York City to accept venture capital funding for his first company, Flogg. Ben was recognized as one of the youngest people ever to receive a round of venture capital in technology, at the age of 15.

Career

Flogg 
In April 2015, Pasternak founded Flogg, a social networking app for young people to buy and sell. Pasternak's early success had caught the attention of venture capital firm Binary Capital. Binary agreed to lead a round of venture capital funding in Flogg before the app had launched. Binary were joined by other investors including Greylock Partners, John Maloney and Paul Bricault. Flogg launched in April 2016 and was temporarily the No. 1 trending app on the Australian App Store (iOS). In late 2016, Flogg shut down due to lack of profitability.

Monkey
In November 2016, Ben co-founded Monkey, an app that enabled teenagers to video chat with like-minded people. Monkey had raised US$2 million in funding. By January 2020, the app had over 20 million users and had enabled over 20 billion calls. The app peaked at No. 1 on the US App Store (iOS). On the first of December, 2017, social networking company Holla announced that it had acquired Monkey for an undisclosed sum.

SIMULATE
In early 2018, Ben co-founded SIMULATE. SIMULATE's mission is to accelerate the world's transition to sustainable nutrition. Its first product, NUGGS, is a chicken nugget substitute made out of plant inputs. In June 2021, Bloomberg reported that SIMULATE had raised over US$ in funding from investors including Alexis Ohanian's venture fund Seven Seven Six, Chris Sacca, McCain Foods, and Jay-Z at over a US$ valuation.

Personal life 
Pasternak lives in the Soho neighborhood of New York City.

References

1999 births
Living people
Businesspeople from Sydney
Australian expatriates in the United States
People educated at Moriah College